Midnight Tides is the fifth volume of Canadian author Steven Erikson's epic fantasy series, the Malazan Book of the Fallen. Although it is part of the larger series, it has only limited references to the previous books. However, it is not a stand-alone volume as the events of the books Reaper's Gale and Dust of Dreams follow on from it.

The novel was first published in the United Kingdom as a hardcover on 1 March 2004, with a mass-market paperback following on 1 March 2005. The first American edition came out on 17 April 2007.

Plot summary
The Tiste Edur tribes are to meet with a delegation from the Kingdom of Lether to discuss a treaty.  Meanwhile, the city of Lether is preparing for the fulfillment of a prophecy which states that at the Seventh Closure the King shall become Emperor.

To increase his power, the Warlock King sends Trull Sengar and his brothers Fear, Binadas and Rhulad on a quest to recover a sword. When they find the sword, they are attacked by a tribe of Soletaken. Rhulad takes up the sword in combat and is killed while bearing it. The Sengar brothers return bearing Rhulad's corpse. The corpse will not relinquish the sword, causing a feud between the Warlock King and the Sengars. While his body is being prepared for its funeral, Rhulad returns from the dead through the machinations of the Crippled God. Rhulad regains his sanity and seizes power over the Edur. He expels the Letherii delegation and begins preparations for war. Hull Beddict stays and swears his allegiance to Rhulad.

Tehol Beddict evacuates non-citizens from Lether, outmanoeuvres Gerun Eberict, and keeps his partners outwitted. His brother Brys Beddict attempts to maintain order in the city, and forms an allegiance with an ancient god. King Diskanar crowns himself Emperor while Letherii forces under the Queen and Prince are routed and destroyed in battle. The Azath House is dying and entrusts an undead child named Kettle to feed it blood to keep it alive. She is contacted by Bugg, who has more knowledge than one would suspect for a lowly manservant. He gives her advice. Later, a number of beings escape the Azath House, only to be dealt with by the mysterious Bugg.

Simultaneously, the Edur enter the city and take the palace, despite resistance by the Ceda and Brys Beddict. Trull Sengar kills the Ceda and Brys challenges Rhulad.  Brys incapacitates Rhulad without killing him. The rest of the Edur cannot bring themselves to kill their emperor, so he lies on the ground screaming. Newly crowned Emperor Diskanar commits suicide using poisoned wine, as he expected to lose. Upon maiming Rhulad, Brys is pushed to drink from the poisoned chalice, and thus dies. His body is taken by his forgotten god.

Back in the Azath house, in the midst of a fierce battle, Udinaas arrives and frees Silchas Ruin. Ruin helps destroy the other creatures. Despite the opportunity to escape, Trull decides to return to Rhulad to aid him in finding his sanity. Tehol, meanwhile, is attacked and nearly killed. His brother Hull is murdered for betraying the Letherii, leaving only lowly Bugg to protect him. Bugg, revealing himself as the Elder God of the Seas, Mael, saves Tehol. As the book ends, Bugg/Mael leaves to confront the Crippled God.

Critical reception
Reviewers have praised Erikson's world-building as well as characterization, noting that it is the most significant work of epic fantasy since Stephen R. Donaldson's Chronicles of Thomas Covenant. Erikson revisits several themes used in his prior novels. Publishers Weekly noted that ".. readers with a taste for massive high fantasy epics will welcome Erikson's fifth entry in his Malazan Book of the Fallen saga, though it largely deals with the calm between storms."

References

External links
 
 

2004 Canadian novels
Malazan Book of the Fallen
Novels by Steven Erikson
Bantam Books books
High fantasy novels
Human-zombie romance in fiction
Tor Books books
Zombie novels